Inigo Jackson (19 July 1933 – 25 August 2001)  was an English actor who appeared in theatre, films and television. He was christened Anthony Michael Jackson.

After leaving RADA in 1961, he changed his first name to Inigo believing that his birth name of Anthony Michael Jackson was too mundane sounding for a show business career.

One of his earliest film roles was that of Robert de Beaumont in Becket (1964).
He later made many television appearances most notably as Athelstane in Ivanhoe and Zentos in the Doctor Who serial The Ark.

Filmography

Film

Television

References

External links
 

1933 births
British male stage actors
British male film actors
British male television actors
2001 deaths
Alumni of RADA